The Order of Glory was a Soviet military decoration established on 8 November 1943 by Decree of the Presidium of the Supreme Soviet. It had three classes, awarded to soldiers and non-commissioned officers of the Red Army and to junior officers of the Red Air Force. Those who received all three classes of the Order received the title "Full Cavalier of the Order of Glory", which was equal in rank and status to a Hero of the Soviet Union.

Due to clerical errors, a total of 87 people were awarded the Order of Glory four times by the Presidium of the Supreme Soviet. Only one person, was awarded the Order of Glory it five times. This list is ordered alphabetically per the Cyrillic alphabet by surname. Those who were awarded the Order of Glory posthumously are highlighted in gray.

Notes

Citations

Recipients of the Order of Glory